The Latvian Evangelical Lutheran Church in America  (LELBA) is a Lutheran denomination, formed in 1957 as a federation, and reorganized in 1975 as a formal denomination. In 1978 Lauma Lagzdins Zusevics was ordained as the first woman to serve as a full-time minister for the LELBA. In 2014 she became the first female Lutheran bishop in Latvian history, as the Church of Latvia proper does not recognize women's ordination.

As of 2007, 12,000 congregants and 68 congregations of the church were present in the United States. It is headquartered in Milwaukee, Wisconsin.

See also 
 Latvian Evangelical Lutheran Church Abroad

References

External links 
 Latvian congregation in Washington D. C. 
 Latvian congregation in New York
 
Lutheran denominations in North America

Latvian-American history